Le Vernet is a commune in the Allier department in Auvergne-Rhône-Alpes in central France.

Population

Administration 
 1793–1801: member of the canton of Vichy
 1801–1892: member of the canton of Cusset
 1892–1973: member of the canton of Vichy
 1973–1985: member of the canton of Vichy-Sud
 1985–2015: member of the canton of Cusset-Sud
 2015–: member of the canton of Lapalisse

List of mayors 
 1977–2001: Gérard Charasse
 2001–2014: Patrick Argout
 2014–2026: Bernard Aguiar

See also
Communes of the Allier department

References

Communes of Allier
Allier communes articles needing translation from French Wikipedia